Gwinear may refer to:

 Gwinear, Cornwall, a village in the United Kingdom, named for the saint
 Gwinear Downs, a village in the parish of Crowan, Cornwall
 Gwinear-Gwithian, the civil parish which includes the village of Gwinear
 Gwinear Road, a disused railway station
 Saint Gwinear, a Cornish saint
 St Gwinear’s Church, Gwinear, the parish church